Karen Minier (born 22 March 1973 in Charleroi), is a Belgian television presenter.

She studied journalism at the Free University of Brussels, and was then signed to a modelling agency. She interviewed F1 drivers for the 2003/4 seasons for the French TF1 show F1 in one and presented the show They have ways of making you talk in 2005 on Teva. She participated in the Rally du Princess in 2005 and 2006, during which she won a stage. Since August 2006, she has co-presented Children of the TV alongside Arthur. After the birth of her son, she resumed modelling with the Dominique Models Agency.

In 2005, she started a relationship with Scottish F1 driver David Coulthard. Minier gave birth to the couple's son on 21 November 2008, in Brussels. Minier has a daughter from a previous relationship. The couple were married in Monaco on 27 November 2013.

References

1973 births
Living people
People from Charleroi
Belgian journalists
Belgian television presenters
French television presenters
French women journalists
French women television presenters
Belgian television journalists
Belgian women television journalists
French television journalists
French women television journalists
Belgian expatriates in Monaco
Formula One journalists and reporters
Université libre de Bruxelles alumni
Belgian women journalists
Belgian women television presenters
Racing drivers' wives and girlfriends